John Norman Abell (18 September 1931 – 25 May 2004) was an English cricketer active in the 1950s. Born at Chelsfield, Kent, Abell was the son of the cricketer George Abell. He attended Marlborough College, before undertaking studies at Worcester College, Oxford. While at Oxford he played three first-class cricket matches for Oxford University, playing twice in 1952 against the Free Foresters and Sussex, and once in 1953 against Worcestershire. A right-handed batsman and wicket-keeper, Abell scored 56 runs in his three matches, top-scoring 25, while behind the stumps he took two catches and made six stumpings. He notably stumped both Richardson brothers (Dick and Peter) against Worcestershire. Unlike his father, Abell did not manage to win a cricketing blue.

He died at Marlborough, Wiltshire on 25 May 2004. His brother Timothy Abell and great-uncle Ted Sale both played first-class cricket.

References

External links 
John Abell at ESPNcricinfo
John Abell at CricketArchive

1931 births
2004 deaths
People from Orpington
People educated at Marlborough College
Alumni of Worcester College, Oxford
English cricketers
Oxford University cricketers
Wicket-keepers